Deej is a 2017 documentary about David James (DJ) Savarese, a nonspeaking autistic teenager with disabilities who is depicted as communicating through the scientifically discredited facilitated communication technique. The film's unskeptical depiction of facilitated communication, including the claims that DJ's degree from Oberlin College is legitimate, and that he is the author of the film's script (rather than it being created by his facilitator), have been the subject of criticism.

Background 
The film was directed by Robert Rooy. David James Savarese, known as DJ or Deej, was also credited as a director and co-producer of the documentary. The film depicts Savarese as an activist with the goal of promoting communication access for nonspeaking autistic people as part of the neurodiversity movement.

Savarese was adopted from the foster care system and diagnosed early in life as autistic. As a child, his adoptive parents struggled to ensure his inclusion in the local public school system. Eventually winning the right for Savarese to receive education in public schools, his parents framed their challenges as a civil rights struggle against ableism. Since the events featured in Deej, Savarese was awarded a degree from Oberlin College for coursework completed through a facilitator.

Deej aired nationally on PBS in October 2017.

Criticism
This film portrays the use of facilitated communication as legitimate. The documentary does not mention that scientific studies have raised questions about facilitated communication and the film's depiction of facilitated communication was the subject of one critical essay in a peer reviewed journal. Behavioral scientist and author, Craig Foster notes that Deej is never shown independently communicating or exhibiting his "hidden intelligence", even though the documentary implies that he does. Foster argues that "skepticism toward facilitated communication is necessary to ameliorate its harmful influence and to encourage genuine acceptance of people with complex communication needs."

Janyce L. Boynton judges the film in a review to be "uncritical promotion" of facilitated communication and notes that the film's editors "chose to leave out some vital information." She concludes that the documentary is a "missed opportunity to teach people what about what living with autism is really like" and that the story the film tells is "one sided and built on facilitator-authored messages."

Awards

 Peabody award
 Chagrin Documentary Festival – Winner, Best Feature
 Indigo Moon Film Festival – Winner, Best Documentary
 Newburyport Film Festival – Audience Award
 Superfest Disability Film Festival – Best Feature

References

External links 
 
 
 "ASHA Policy Statement"

American documentary films
2017 films
Documentary films about autism
Facilitated communication
2010s American films
Films about disability